Roger Federer was the defending champion and retained the title, beating Kei Nishikori in the final, 6–1, 6–3. It was Federer's first title in almost ten months but was the first of three that Federer won in succession to end the season.

Seeds

Draw

Finals

Top half

Bottom half

Qualifying

Seeds

Qualifiers

Lucky losers

  Mikhail Kukushkin
  Marco Chiudinelli

Qualifying draw

First qualifier

Second qualifier

Third qualifier

Fourth qualifier

References
 Main Draw
 Qualifying Draw

Davidoff Swiss Indoors - qualifying
2011 Davidoff Swiss Indoors